Dag Heward-Mills (born 14 May 1963) is an evangelist, pastor, author, and conference speaker based in Accra, Ghana. He is the founder and presiding Bishop of the United Denominations Originating from the Lighthouse Group of Churches (UD-OLGC), formerly known as Lighthouse Chapel International (LCI) and the United Organization of FirstLove Churches in 190 nations (UO-FLC 190).

The Anagkazo Bible and Ministry Training Center (ABMTC) is one of the largest Bible schools in Africa, is located at Mampong in the Eastern Region of Ghana. It was founded by Heward-Mills. He served on the board of directors of Church Growth International and the executive committee of the Pentecostal World Fellowship.

Early life
Dag Heward-Mills was born on May 14, 1963 in London to Elizabeth and Nathaniel Heward-Mills. They moved to Ghana where he attended Achimota School.

Education
Dag Heward-Mills attended University of Ghana Medical School and graduated in 1989.

Career 
He heard the Lord say to him; "From now, you can teach." He started a fellowship of 5 people in 1985 in a canteen. During that period, he preached in the morning. In 1988, Heward-Mills started Lighthouse Chapel International. They would meet in canteens in 1985. They bought a local theater in Korle-Gonno in 1991.

Anagkazo Bible School 
He founded the Anagkazo Bible and Ministry Training Center (ABMTC) to train men and women in the practical work of the ministry. The Bible School campus is located in the Akuapem mountains, and is one of the largest privately-owned campuses in the country.

The First Love Church 
In 2011, Heward-Mills became pastor of First Love Church, now known as the United Organization of First Love Churches in 190 nations (UO-FLC 190). This happened, he says, when he received a clear instruction from God to go back to his “First Love".

UD-OLGC 
The evangelist created churches that are known now part of the UD-OLGC;
Qodesh Family Church (QFC)
Qodesh Family Church North and South America (QFC Americas)
Shepherd House International (SHI)
Loyalty House International (LHI)
The Makarios Church 
Jesus is the Answer Church
Lighthouse Chapel International Kenya
Healing Jesus Missions International (HJMI)
Catch the Anointing Center (CtA)
Greater Love Church (GLC)
Machaneh Church International
The Mustard Seed Chapel
Anagkazo Assemblies

Books
 The Loyalty and Disloyalty series of ten titles
The Mega Church.
The Art of Leadership
 The Art of Hearing
 The Model Marriage
  Forgiveness Made Easy
 Know your Invisible Enemies and Defeat them

Recognition 
In January 2023, Heward-Mills was recognized and listed among the 100 most reputable Africans.

See also 
 Lighthouse Chapel International

References

External links 
 

Ghanaian Christians
Ghanaian people of Swiss descent
Living people
1963 births
Ghanaian clergy
Ghanaian religious leaders
University of Ghana Medical School alumni
Alumni of Achimota School
Ga-Adangbe people